Vitaliy Trush (born June 6, 1996, in Stryi, Lviv Oblast, Ukraine) is a Ukrainian biathlete. He was a silver medalist in youth relay at the Biathlon Junior World Championships 2015 in Minsk.

Performances

IBU Cup

Relay podiums

IBU Junior Cup

Individual podiums

External links
 Trush's profile at biathlon.com.ua

1996 births
Living people
Ukrainian male biathletes